Unfriended: Dark Web is a 2018 American screenlife horror film written and directed by Stephen Susco in his directorial debut. Shot as a computer screen film, it stars Colin Woodell, Rebecca Rittenhouse, Betty Gabriel, Connor Del Rio, Andrew Lees, Stephanie Nogueras, and Savira Windyani. It is a stand-alone sequel to the 2015 film Unfriended, as none of the previous films' events or characters are mentioned. The plot follows a group of friends who find a laptop that has access to the dark web, only to realize they are being watched by the original owners, a group of cybercriminal hackers.

The film had its world premiere at the South by Southwest festival on March 9, 2018, and was theatrically released in the United States on July 20, 2018, by Universal Pictures' OTL Releasing and Blumhouse Productions' BH Tilt. The film received mixed reviews from critics and has grossed $16 million worldwide, against a production budget of $1 million.

Plot

A man named Matias finds a laptop at a cyber café lost-and-found and takes it home. The laptop originally belonged to someone called Norah C. IV. Matias is working with a sign language app titled Papaya for his deaf girlfriend, Amaya. However, Amaya becomes upset because the app only makes it convenient for her to understand him, but not for him to understand her. Matias keeps getting messages on the laptop for Norah from someone named Erica. He logs onto a Skype video call with his friends — Damon, A.J., Lexx, Serena, and Nari — but becomes frustrated when the computer keeps freezing up. Matias discovers that Erica is Norah when she demands her laptop back. He decides to return it to the cyber café, but before he can, he sees a message for Norah about the payment they received for a video. Curious, he converses with the mystery person, Charon68. Matias' friends watch his actions, and A.J. recognizes that Matias is connected to the dark web. When Charon68 mentions trepanation, a disturbed Matias ends the chat.

Damon realizes that "Norah C." is "Charon" spelled backward, as Matias begins to find hidden videos on the laptop. He looks up a street address listed in one of them and sees that Erica Dunne went missing from there; the same Erica that Norah was impersonating. Matias receives a video call from Amaya, only to find that it is Norah C., also known as Charon IV, continuing to demand his laptop back, or else he'll kill Amaya. When Nari tries to call the police, Matias panics and explains that it was all part of an alternate reality game he is developing. His friends are relieved, but Nari remains suspicious. Matias tries to convince Amaya to come over, but she's still upset with him, believing he doesn't want to put in the effort to learn sign language for her. Matias promises he will try and convinces her to come over, though Charon IV secretly follows her. To ensure Charon IV complies, Matias transfers his cryptocurrency from her profile into his. Norah chides Matias for this, but he says he'll return the money and laptop in exchange for Amaya and Erica's safety.

Matias directs Amaya to the subway so that she will lose connection - once her signal is lost, he tells his friends that the entire thing was real and explains that they are all in danger. Matias suddenly receives messages from a group called "The Circle," who reveal that they are aware of Matias' actions, and dozens of Charon accounts join the chat. One of them posts a video of Lexx being thrown off a roof while another doctors videos of A.J. planning to attack a shopping mall. As police officers storm A.J.'s house, the Circle triggers the sound effect of a shotgun loading on his computer, causing the police to assume he is armed and shoot him to death. Next, they show Nari at the subway and Serena's mother on life support, forcing Serena to save one of them. When she can't make the decision, the Circle kills all three. Matias goes to get Amaya, leaving the laptop open so Damon can copy its files. Unbeknownst to Matias, another Charon brings Erica into his closet. When a Charon takes control of the laptop, Damon tells the Circle he was recording everything for the police to find. To his horror, he realizes that the Circle had planned for Matias to find the laptop so they could frame him and his friends for their crimes. Moments later, a Charon hangs Damon by his closet door. Another Charon writes a fake confession and suicide note, implying everyone killed themselves out of guilt. Matias gets a call from Amaya and realizes that the Circle hacked his messages to lead her astray. He helplessly watches as Amaya is attacked by a Charon, most likely to be part of their videos. Broken, he asks the Circle why they did all of this. They respond with a clip of him saying it was "game night," revealing that this is simply entertainment for them.

The Circle launches a poll to decide Matias' fate; as they vote, he laughs, no longer caring about his safety. Erica wakes up in Matias' apartment and goes to the computer begging for help. The video cuts out as she finds a hole in her skull. In the street, the poll reaches its end before a Charon in a van fatally strikes Matias, killing him. With their job complete and their crimes pinned on Matias and his friends, the Circle gather in front of the cameras and celebrate while another Charon watches from a camera.

There have been three alternate endings: The first one shows Matias riding his bike after telling Amaya to meet where they had their first kiss. When Matias gets there, he sees an open coffin when he is knocked out by a Charon with a shovel. Damon is shown seeing Erica waking up in Matias’ apartment and finding a hole in her head; then being cut out. Damon cries as he sees someone in his house with a Charon killing him by hanging him while leaving a suicide note in his laptop (shown in all three alternate endings). A few minutes later, Amaya gets to the place where they had their first kiss while Matias wakes up in a coffin and realizes he was buried alive. As Matias is FaceTiming her, the Circle hacked him by censoring his mouth. When he texts Amaya, the Circle hack his phone so his phone will say “I wish I could sign better”. Since Amaya is deaf, she can’t hear Matias screaming for help. The Circle gather around the cameras to celebrate while a Charon is watching Matias from a camera as he slowly dies.

Cast

Production
In April 2015, the month of Unfriended'''s release, it was announced that Universal Pictures had greenlit a sequel, tentatively titled Unfriended 2, with Nelson Greaves writing and Jason Blum and Timur Bekmambetov producing, and a release date then set for the spring of 2016.

On October 3, 2017, it was reported that The Grudge and Texas Chainsaw 3D writer Stephen Susco had taken over the project as writer and director. Susco shot the film in secret over one week in late 2016, under the working title Unfriended: Game Night.

In March 2018, Blumhouse officially revealed the film as Unfriended: Dark Web at SXSW 2018, under the distribution of Universal's OTL Releasing and Blumhouse's BH Tilt.

ReleaseUnfriended: Dark Web was released in the United States on July 20, 2018. It had a surprise premiere at South by Southwest in March 2018, and then in April 2018 was screened at the Overlook Film Festival with an entirely different ending. It was then revealed in July 2018 that the film would be sent to theaters with the two different endings, which would be played at random, similar to 1985's Clue, which had multiple endings.

However, the director has stated that there is only one ending, and that the rumor came from re-editing the film after various test screenings. Still, multiple movie theatre projectionists have confirmed that they were given two copies of the film, each with a different ending, and were told to wait until further instruction on which version to play at their specific location.

Reception

Box office
In the United States and Canada, Unfriended: Dark Web was released alongside 2 other sequels, Mamma Mia! Here We Go Again and The Equalizer 2, and was initially projected to gross $6–8 million from 1,543 theaters in its opening weekend. However, after making $1.42222 million on its first day, including $350,000 from Thursday night previews, estimates were lowered to $3 million. The film went on to debut to $3.5 million, finishing ninth at the box office. By the end of its theatrical run, the film grossed $15.1 million worldwide, including $8.8 million domestically, less than the $15 million the first film made in its opening weekend alone.

Critical response
The website's critical consensus reads, "Unfriended: Dark Web is more interested in chills than an exploration of its timely themes, but horror fans should still find this sequel to be steadily, undeniably effective." On Metacritic, the film has a weighted average score of 53 out of 100, based on reviews from 26 critics, indicating "mixed or average reviews". Audiences polled by CinemaScore gave the film an average grade of "C" on an A+ to F scale, the same score as the first film, while PostTrak reported filmgoers gave it a "low" 59% overall positive score.

In a positive review in Vanity Fair, K. Austin Collins wrote that the film "couldn’t seem more topical or relevant," and that it "leaves discerning viewers as entertained and skeptical as they are shaken." Geoffrey Macnab of The Independent wrote that Unfriended: Dark Web "may be an exploitation movie but it’s an ingeniously made one with a highly original storytelling style which reflects perfectly the screen-dominated lives and leisure habits of its young protagonists."

In a negative review for RogerEbert.com, Nick Allen wrote "Curiosity killed the dumb horror character, as we know from cinematic death-traps structured just like this one, but Unfriended: Dark Web stretches this conceit until it snaps, which happens about 15 minutes in." He added, "good poutine gravy, are these characters dumb, and the movie even more so."

Possible sequel
Susco has teased his interest in a third Unfriended film, while also expanding upon Bekmambetov's Screenlife genre that Dark Web is a part of. He stated that it is possible that a third film might be made and that it is important that people have a great time watching it and that it leaves them with questions. But while Susco is noncommittal regarding a third Unfriended, he did go into detail about the Screenlife genre, consisting of films that unfold entirely on computer screens, and has been masterminded by Unfriended'' producer Bekmambetov.

References

External links
 Official website
 

2018 horror films
2018 horror thriller films
2010s teen horror films
American sequel films
American teen horror films
Blumhouse Productions films
2018 directorial debut films
Films about cryptocurrencies
Dark web
Found footage films
Films about the Internet
Films produced by Jason Blum
Films with screenplays by Stephen Susco
Techno-horror films
Unfriended (film series)
Works about computer hacking
Bazelevs Company films
Screenlife films
2010s American films